Soumya Sarkar (born 25 February 1993) is a Bangladeshi cricketer. He is a left-handed batsman and a right arm medium-fast bowler who mainly plays as an opening batsman and the creator of the good looking " Shot". He is the only batsman to hit 2 sixes in the first over in a T20 World Cup match. Sarkar plays for the Cumilla Warriors in the Bangladesh Premier League, Khulna Division in the National Cricket League, and Prime Bank Cricket Club in the Dhaka Premier Division.In Bangladesh Premier League draft, he has been drafted by Dhaka Dominators.

Personal life
Sarkar was born in Satkhira to a Bengali Hindu family. He was named Soumya Shanto but later the word 'Shanto' was dropped from his name. On 27 February 2020, Sarkar married his long-time girlfriend Priyonti Debnath Puja. The marriage ceremony was held at Khulna Club. His wife, 21-year-old Puja, is the daughter of Gopal Debnath of Tutpara village in Khulna.

Domestic career
Sarkar is a top-order batter, who was a part of the 2010 and 2012 Under-19 World Cup teams. In the 2012 Under-19 World Cup, Sarkar came into the spotlight after 'mankading' Australia's Jimmy Peirson. He made his first-class debut for Khulna Division against Dhaka Division in the 2010–11 season.

In April 2019, in the final round of matches in the 2018–19 Dhaka Premier Division Cricket League, Sarkar scored 208 not out batting for Abahani Limited against Sheikh Jamal Dhanmondi Club. It was the highest individual total in List A cricket in Bangladesh, and the first double century in List A cricket by a Bangladeshi batsman. Sarkar's innings also contained 16 sixes, also a record for a List A innings in Bangladesh. His record breaking innings propelled Abahani Limited to their 20th Dhaka Premier League title.

Bangladesh Premier League
In October 2018, Sarkar was named in the squad for the Rajshahi Kings team, following the draft for the 2018–19 Bangladesh Premier League.

In November 2019, Sarkar was selected to play for the Cumilla Warriors in the 2019–20 Bangladesh Premier League.
On 28 December 2019, he scored 88* against Rajshahi Royals in the 2019–20 BPL, which was his highest individual score in T20 and his first fifty plus score in last four years in T20. He had a successful journey in the BPL having scored 331 runs and picking up 12 wickets in 12 matches.

Sarkar played for Gazi Group Chattogram In 2020-21 Bangabandhu T20 Cup.

International career

2013–2014
In November 2013, Sarkar was included in Bangladesh's T20 squad for a one-off game against New Zealand, but did not find a place in the final XI. Sarkar was included in the squad for Bangladesh's home series against Zimbabwe in 2014 and finally, he made his One Day International debut for Bangladesh against Zimbabwe on 1 December 2014.

2015–2019
Sarkar represented Bangladesh in the 2015 Cricket World Cup. He holds the record along with Mohammad Kaif and Umar Akmal for taking the most catches in a single World Cup match (4).
Sarkar made his Twenty20 International debut for Bangladesh against Pakistan in April 2015. On 22 April 2015, Sarkar hit his maiden ODI hundred and added 145 with Tamim Iqbal. He made his Test debut against Pakistan in April 2015.

Sarkar also played in Bangladesh's 100th Test match, where they defeated Sri Lanka on their home soil. He played a key role in that historic Test match, scoring 61 in the first innings and taking five catches, the most by any player for Bangladesh in a single Test match. Sarkar also set the record for taking the most catches for Bangladeshi in a Test innings (4).

In 2019, Sarkar scored his maiden Test century against New Zealand at Seddon Park equaling Tamim Iqbal's record who also scored a century in 94 balls against England at Lord's in 2010. In April 2019, he was named in Bangladesh's squad for the 2019 Cricket World Cup. On 24 June 2019, in the match against Afghanistan, Soumya played in his 50th ODI.

In November 2019, Sarkar was named in Bangladesh's squad for the 2019 ACC Emerging Teams Asia Cup in Bangladesh. He was adjudged player of the tournament. Later the same month, he was named in Bangladesh's squad for the cricket tournament at the 2019 South Asian Games. Bangladesh cricket team won the gold medal, after they beat Sri Lanka by seven wickets in the final.

2020-present
In February–March 2020, Sarkar did not feature in the Test and ODI series when Zimbabwe toured Bangladesh due to his marriage. But he was included in the two-match T20I series. In the first T20I, he scored 62 off 32 balls, his highest individual score in T20I (as of 22 May 2021), helping Bangladesh to win the match by 48 runs.

He was named in the T20I squad played against Zimbabwe in July 2021. In the first T20I, he scored his 1000th T20I runs, becoming only fifth Bangladeshi batsman to score 1000 T20I runs and scoring 50 runs off 45 helped Bangladesh for a comprehensive eight-wicket victory. Though he failed with bat in the second match, but in the third match he took two wickets conceding 19 runs in 3 overs and scored his career-best 68 off 49 balls, helping Bangladesh to chase a mammoth target of 193 and winning the series by 2–1 margin. He became the Player of the series for his all-round performance, scoring 126 runs at an average of 42 and picking up 3 wickets.

In September 2021, he was named in Bangladesh's squad for the 2021 ICC Men's T20 World Cup.

References

External links 
 

1993 births
Living people
Bangladeshi cricketers
Bangladesh Test cricketers
Bangladeshi Hindus
Bangladesh One Day International cricketers
Bangladesh Twenty20 International cricketers
Dhaka Dominators cricketers
Khulna Division cricketers
Cricketers at the 2015 Cricket World Cup
People from Satkhira District
Abahani Limited cricketers
Legends of Rupganj cricketers
Victoria Sporting Club cricketers
Rangpur Riders cricketers
Bangladesh South Zone cricketers
Bangladesh under-23 cricketers
Bangladesh A cricketers
Agrani Bank Cricket Club cricketers
Kandahar Knights cricketers
Rajshahi Royals cricketers
South Asian Games gold medalists for Bangladesh
South Asian Games medalists in cricket